Richard J. Curran (January 4, 1838 – June 1, 1915) was an Irish-American surgeon, army officer and U.S. Republican Party politician. He received the Medal of Honor for his actions during the American Civil War. He was born in the town of Ennis in County Clare, Ireland.

Curran immigrated with his parents to the United States in 1850, and attended Harvard Medical School, graduating in 1859. At the start of the Civil War, he helped raise two volunteer companies (designated A company & K company) from Seneca Falls, New York, and joined the 33rd New York Infantry in May 1861, becoming an assistant surgeon in August 1862. He would receive the Medal of Honor for the Battle of Antietam, where he was the regiment's only medical officer present in the field. When the 33rd New York was mustered out in June 1863, he joined the 6th New York Cavalry, and subsequently became the 9th New York Cavalry, serving as the latter's regimental surgeon until the surrender of Robert E. Lee at Appomattox Court House.

Following the war, Curran opened a pharmacy in Rochester, New York, where he also participated in local politics. He was elected to the New York State Assembly in 1891, serving in 1892, and subsequently became Mayor of Rochester, New York in 1892, serving a two-year term.  He was a companion of the New York Commandery of the Military Order of the Loyal Legion of the United States.

He was buried in Holy Sepulchre Cemetery.

Medal of Honor citation
Rank and organization: Assistant Surgeon, 33rd New York Infantry. Place and date: Antietam, Md., 17 September 1862. Entered service at: Seneca Falls, N.Y. Born: 4 January 1838, Ireland. Date of issue: 30 March 1898.

Voluntarily exposed himself to great danger by going to the fighting line there succoring the wounded and helpless and conducting them to the field hospital.

External links
Biography
Harvard University page

1915 deaths
United States Army Medal of Honor recipients
Mayors of Rochester, New York
Harvard Medical School alumni
Year of birth uncertain
Republican Party members of the New York State Assembly
Irish-born Medal of Honor recipients
Irish surgeons
Irish soldiers in the United States Army
American Civil War recipients of the Medal of Honor
1838 births
19th-century American politicians
People from Ennis
United States Army Medical Corps officers